Abdul Samad Amiri was an Afghan human rights activist, whose 2019 murder at the hands of the Taliban was widely reported in the country's media.

Biography 
Abdul Samad Amiri was born in 1990 in Lal Wa Sarjangal District of the Ghor province, Afghanistan. He graduated from the Imam Ali high school of Lal Wa Sarjangal district in 2009. Amiri earned his bachelor's degree in political science from Kabul University. After that, he pursued a career in human rights advocacy.

Amiri was married shortly before his death, and his wife just gave birth to a baby girl. His sister, Atifa, was studying for a master's degree in India when Amiri was shot.

Amiri worked for the Afghanistan Independent Human Rights Commission. He served as the acting director for the Ghor Province. In this role, Amiri worked with the Commission to promote the rights of women and religious minorities, as well as investigate killings believed to have been perpetrated by the Taliban.

Death 
Abdul Samad Amiri was killed by the Taliban on September 4, 2019. While traveling from Kabul to Ghowr, the Taliban kidnapped Amiri and killed him the following day. His body was found the following morning on September 5. His killing came in the wake of a very violent period of Afghanistan's history, as the Taliban and Afghan government have continued to struggle for local sovereignty. As a human rights activist with the Afghani Independent Human Rights Commission, Amiri held one of the most dangerous jobs in Afghanistan. Several of his peers have been killed in recent years for human rights activity in the country.

References

External sources

1990 births
2019 deaths
Afghan activists